Flowers is a British black comedy-drama sitcom written by Will Sharpe and starring Olivia Colman and Julian Barratt. It was commissioned by the British broadcaster Channel 4, in association with the American TV streaming service Seeso. The first series premiered in the U.K. with two episodes on 25 April 2016 and was broadcast daily during the week, ending on 29 April. In the United States, all 6 episodes were released online on 5 May 2016. The series concluded with a second series following the same pattern, premiering with two episodes on 11 June 2018, in the UK, followed by an episode daily during that week.

Synopsis
The series follows the Flowers family, consisting of depressed father and children's author Maurice (Barratt); music teacher wife Deborah (Colman), their 25-year-old twin children: inventor son Donald (Daniel Rigby) and musician daughter Amy (Sophia Di Martino); Maurice's senile mother Hattie (Leila Hoffman); and Maurice's Japanese illustrator Shun (Sharpe).

Cast
 Olivia Colman as Deborah Flowers
 Julian Barratt as Maurice Flowers
 Will Sharpe as Shun
 Colin Hurley as Barry
 Daniel Rigby as Donald Flowers
 Sophia Di Martino as Amy Flowers
 Leila Hoffman as Hattie Flowers
 Georgina Campbell as Abigail (series 1)
 Angus Wright as George (series 1)
 Harriet Walter as Hylda (series 2)

Episodes

Series overview

Series 1 (2016)

Series 2 (2018)
In May 2018, Channel 4 released a trailer for the second series of the show. It began broadcasting with two episodes on 11 June 2018.

DVD
The complete series 1 was released on DVD in June 2016 by Dazzler Media, while the complete second series was released on DVD in September 2018.

Reception
Reviews for the series were positive. Review aggregator website Rotten Tomatoes rated it 100% "fresh" based on 10 reviews. The Guardian praised the series and called it "a gloriously dark sitcom about depression and rage". The New York Times also reviewed it positively saying, "Flowers isn't really about any particular story. It's a portrait – a weird, Edward Gorey-like portrait of a family with loves, suspicions and insecurities, perhaps not all that different from yours, after all."   
 
Reception of the second series was similarly positive, once again garnering a 100% "fresh" score on Rotten Tomatoes based on 9 reviews. Writing for The Guardian, Sam Wollaston awarded four stars out of five, stating: "The second series of Will Sharpe’s deeply imaginative comedy drama has been serious and sensitive in its handling of difficult issues, and hilarious to boot."

Awards and nominations

References

External links
 

2016 British television series debuts
2018 British television series endings
2010s British black comedy television series
2010s British comedy-drama television series
2010s British LGBT-related comedy television series
2010s British LGBT-related drama television series
2010s British sitcoms
British LGBT-related sitcoms
Channel 4 comedy dramas
English-language television shows
Lesbian-related television shows
Television about mental health
Seeso original programming
Television series about dysfunctional families
Television series about marriage
Television series about twins
Television series by Endemol
Works about depression